Luis Alfonso Rodríguez Mata (born October 14, 1994) is a professional Mexican footballer who currently plays for Tepatitlán de Morelos.

References

External links
 

Living people
1994 births
Association football midfielders
Altamira F.C. players
Atlas F.C. footballers
C.D. Tepatitlán de Morelos players
Ascenso MX players
Liga Premier de México players
Tercera División de México players
Footballers from Guadalajara, Jalisco
Mexican footballers